The Royal palaces in the Kingdom of Sweden are the following:

The Royal Palace in Stockholm
Drottningholm Palace
Chinese Pavilion at Drottningholm
Gripsholm Castle, Mariefred
Gustav III's Pavilion
Haga Palace
Rosendal Palace
Rosersberg Palace
Strömsholm Palace
Tullgarn Palace
Ulriksdal Palace

The Royal Palaces are the property of the Swedish State, administered  and managed through the National Property Board, and are at the disposal of the King.

Privately owned royal properties
In addition, there are also residences which are privately owned by the Royal Family, such as Solliden Palace on the island of Öland.

See also 
Riddarholm Church (where most kings are buried)
Royal Djurgården
List of castles and palaces in Sweden

External links 
Official site

 
Crown palaces
Sweden
Palaces